Gail Phoebus (born January 16, 1950) is an American Republican Party politician who represented the 24th Legislative District in the New Jersey General Assembly from December 3, 2015, to January 9, 2018.

Early life 
A resident of Andover Township, Phoebus received an associate degree from Centenary College (now Centenary University) with a major in retail/ merchandising. She and her husband own the Farmstead Golf and Country Club. In January 1974, she married Robert Phoebus, son of the original owners of the country club in Lafayette Township, New Jersey. Phoebus served on the Andover Township Committee from 2006 to 2012. She was elected to the Sussex County Board of Chosen Freeholders, serving from 2013 to 2015.

New Jersey Assembly 
Phoebus was sworn into the Assembly on December 3, 2015, by Vincent Prieto after having been chosen to fill the seat vacated two months earlier by the resignation of Alison Littell McHose.

Committees 
Appropriations
Human Services
Telecommunications and Utilities
Women and Children

2017 State Senate Campaign 
She opted to run for a second term in 2017 to mount a primary challenge against incumbent state Senator Steve Oroho. She dropped out before the primary.

Electoral history

New Jersey Assembly

References

External links
Assemblywoman Phoebus's legislative web page , New Jersey Legislature
New Jersey Legislature financial disclosure forms
2015

1950 births
Living people
Centenary University alumni
County commissioners in New Jersey
New Jersey city council members
Republican Party members of the New Jersey General Assembly
Politicians from Sussex County, New Jersey
21st-century American politicians
Women city councillors in New Jersey
21st-century American women politicians